Led Zeppelin singer Robert Plant has performed solo tours since 1981.

1980s
Principle of Moments Tour - June 22, 1983 to February 26, 1984.
The Shaken 'N' Stirred Tour – January 18, 1985 to December 19, 1986.
Non Stop Go Tour - December 17, 1987 to December 23,. 1989

Now and Zen tour 1988-89

1990s
Manic Nirvana Tour - May 1, 1990 to January 10, 1991.
Fate of Nations Tour - May 1, 1993 to January 28, 1994.
Priory of Brion Tour - July 23, 1999 to December 20, 2000.

2000s
Dreamland Tour - May 22, 2002 to August 23, 2003.
Mighty ReArranger Tour - 2005.

2010s

2013
The 2013 tours were billed as "Sensational Space Shifters – Robert Plant, the voice of Led Zeppelin".

2014
The 2014 tours were billed as "Sensational Space Shifters – Robert Plant, the voice of Led Zeppelin".

2015

2016

2017
source:

2018

Notes

References

Sources and external links
 Robert Plant Official Website / News 
 Robert Plant Official Website / On The Road 
 
ledzepconcerts.com / Robert Plant Concert Dates Past & present versions

Concert tours
Lists of concert tours